The Academy of Arts and Culture in Osijek is a Croatian art school affiliated with the University of Osijek.

History

The Academy was founded in October 2004 when the Department Section of Music ceased to be a part of the Faculty of Philosophy in Osijek in order to be joined by some new courses (Piano, Voice, Acting and Puppetry, Fine Arts) in the formation of an independent institution.

In October 2005, the Academy moved to its own premises once occupied by the barracks and now the location of the future university campus.
Until then, the courses had been taught at different locations in Osijek, such as the Faculty of Philosophy, Branko Mihaljević Children's Theatre, the Croatian National Theatre, the Students' Centre and the Kazamat Gallery.

Today, the Academy has at its disposal some 3000 square meters, including four buildings with separate rooms for the theoretical and practical teaching of each course, its own library and the dean's office.
The departments of the Academy (the Department of Music, the Department of Fine Arts and the Department of Dramatic Art) organise and run the following five courses: Voice, Piano, Music Education, Fine Arts, Acting and Puppetry.

Since the academic year 2005–06, the study programmes have been implemented in accordance with the Bologna process.

Organization

The Academy has 3 departments:

 Department of Music
 Department of Theatre Arts
 Department of Fine Arts

References

External links
 Official website 

Educational institutions established in 2004
University of Osijek
Art schools in Croatia
2004 establishments in Croatia